Jon Altuna Mendizábal (born 24 June 1980 in Ibarra (Gipuzkoa)) is a Spanish retired footballer who played as an attacking midfielder.

External links
 

1980 births
Living people
People from Tolosaldea
Spanish footballers
Footballers from the Basque Country (autonomous community)
Association football midfielders
Segunda División players
Segunda División B players
CD Logroñés footballers
Barakaldo CF footballers
SD Eibar footballers
Granada CF footballers
SD Amorebieta footballers
CD Aurrerá de Vitoria footballers